Shay Willock (born 15 September 2003) is an English footballer who plays as a striker for  club Walsall.

Career
Willock made his debut for Walsall on 30 November 2021 as a substitute against Cambridge United in the EFL Trophy. He made his league debut as a late substitute in a 3–0 win over Colchester United on 11 December 2021.

References

External links

2003 births
Living people
English footballers
Association football midfielders
Walsall F.C. players
English Football League players